Gabrielle Faith "Gabby" Andrews (born December 23, 1996 is an American professional tennis player. On October 22, 2012, she reached her highest WTA singles ranking of 938. Andrews is best known for reaching the final at the 2011 US Open girls' doubles event and for winning the same event at the 2012 Australian Open alongside fellow American Taylor Townsend.

On May 25, 2019, playing for the UCLA Bruins, she and teammate Ayan Broomfield won the doubles event at the 2019 NCAA Division I Women's Tennis Championship, defeating Kate Fahey and Brienne Minor of the Michigan Wolverines.

Career statistics

Junior Grand Slam finals

Doubles: 2 finals (1 title, 1 runner-up)

References

External links 
 
 
 Gabrielle Andrews at the Tennis Recruiting Network
 Gabby Andrews at UCLA Bruins Women's Tennis
 
 

1996 births
Living people
People from West Covina, California
American female tennis players
Australian Open (tennis) junior champions
US Open (tennis) junior champions
Grand Slam (tennis) champions in girls' doubles
UCLA Bruins women's tennis players
Tennis people from California